Wendy Romero (born ) is a Venezuelan female volleyball player. She was part of the Venezuela women's national volleyball team.

She competed with the national team at the 2008 Summer Olympics in Beijing,  China.
She played with Cojedes in 2008.

Clubs
  Cojedes (2008)

See also
 Venezuela at the 2008 Summer Olympics

References

External links
http://www.scoresway.com/zgorzelec?sport=volleyball&page=player&id=5123
http://www.parkathletics.com/roster/18/15/1229.php
http://www.todor66.com/volleyball/Olympics/Women_2008.html
2008 Official Results Part Two: Hockey – Wrestling, LA84 Foundation.

1992 births
Living people
Venezuelan women's volleyball players
Place of birth missing (living people)
Volleyball players at the 2008 Summer Olympics
Olympic volleyball players of Venezuela